Charles John Scott Sergel (12 May 1911 – 21 May 1980) was a surgeon, missionary doctor and a rower who competed at the 1932 Summer Olympics.

Sergel was born in Rio de Janeiro, Brazil, the son of missionaries. He attended Monkton Combe School and Clare College, Cambridge. In 1931 and 1932 he was a member of the winning Cambridge boats in the 1932 and 1933 Boat Races.  The 1932 crew won the Grand Challenge Cup at Henley Royal Regatta rowing as Leander Club, and was subsequently chosen to represent Great Britain at the 1932 Summer Olympics in Los Angeles, where they came fourth. He again represented the winning Cambridge crew in the Boat Race in 1933 when he was president.

In 1937 Sergel qualified as a doctor at St Mary's Hospital and after working for a year in hospitals he went to Uganda in 1938 as a missionary. In the following year, after the outbreak of World War II he joined the medical corps in East Africa and served throughout the war becoming a major.

After the war Sergel returned as a surgeon to Mengo Hospital in Kampala and as a Christian missionary doctor in the villages. He left Africa in 1952 and returned to England, where he became a FRCS and went into general practice at Great Shelford, Cambridgeshire. He coached the crews at Clare College and took up sailing.

Sergel retired in 1976 to Milford-on-Sea where he kept his boat. When he decided to give up his boat, he took a farewell journey and in the course of it died of a heart attack.

Sergel married Elizabeth Joan Stileman in 1947 and had two daughters.

Publications
C J S SERGEL. Surgical emphysema of intestine after gastro-enterostomy. East African medical journal. 1951 Oct;28(10): 413-4

See also
List of Cambridge University Boat Race crews

References

1911 births
1980 deaths
People educated at Monkton Combe School
Alumni of Clare College, Cambridge
Cambridge University Boat Club rowers
British male rowers
Olympic rowers of Great Britain
Rowers at the 1932 Summer Olympics
20th-century English medical doctors
English Protestant missionaries
British Army personnel of World War II
Protestant missionaries in Uganda
Christian medical missionaries
People from Rio de Janeiro (city)
People from Great Shelford
People from Milford on Sea